Suurijärvi is a medium-sized lake in the Vuoksi main catchment area. It is located in the regions North Karelia and Southern Savonia in Finland. The name Suurijärvi means Big Lake. There are 32 lakes with the same name in Finland. This one is the biggest of them.

See also
List of lakes in Finland

References

Lakes of Heinävesi
Lakes of Liperi